The 2013 Prague Open by Advantage Cars was a professional tennis tournament played on clay courts. It was the 20th edition of the tournament which was part of the 2013 ATP Challenger Tour. It took place in Prague, Czech Republic between 10 and 16 June 2013.

Singles main draw entrants

Seeds

 1 Rankings are as of May 27, 2013.

Other entrants
The following players received wildcards into the singles main draw:
  Dušan Lojda
  Ivo Minář
  Adrian Sikora
  Robin Staněk

The following players received entry a special exempt into the singles main draw:
  Pere Riba

The following players received entry from the qualifying draw:
  Víctor Estrella
  Lukáš Maršoun
  Jan Šátral
  Dominik Süč

Doubles main draw entrants

Seeds

 1 Rankings are as of May 27, 2013.

Other entrants
The following pair received a wildcard into the doubles main draw:
  Jakub Filipský /  Kryštof Jánošík

The following pair received entry using a protected ranking:
  Víctor Estrella /  Leonardo Kirche

The following pair received entry as an alternate into the doubles main draw:
  Dušan Lojda /  Boy Westerhof

Champions

Singles

 Oleksandr Nedovyesov def.   Javier Martí, 6–0, 6–1

Doubles

 Lee Hsin-han /  Peng Hsien-yin def.  Vahid Mirzadeh /  Denis Zivkovic, 6–4, 4–6, [10–5]

External links
Official Website

Prague Open
Prague Open
Prague Open
2013 in Czech tennis